Dioryctria baumhoferi is a species of snout moth in the genus Dioryctria. It was described by Carl Heinrich in 1956, and is known from the US states of Arizona and California.

The larvae feed on the twigs of Pinus ponderosa.

References

Moths described in 1956
baumhoferi